Geckobia estherae, or Esther's gecko mite, is a species of external parasite from the genus Gekobia and is endemic to the Maltese Islands. Very little is known about it except that its preferred (if not only) host is the local indigenous Moorish gecko Tarentola mauritanica and its preferred part of the body of its host seems to be the forehead. The species to date has only been found in one locality on its quite widespread host and therefore it is not only a Maltese species but a localised endemic. The species was named in honour of Esther Sciberras for her continuous assistance to the finder (Arnold Sciberras) in the study of the natural history.

References 

 Bertrand M., Pfliegler W.P and Sciberras A.(2012) Does the African native host explain the African origin of the parasite? The Maltese Gekobia estherae n.sp parasitic on Tarentola mauritanica (Acari:Raphignathoidea :Pterygosomatidae). Acarologia 52(4): 353–366.

External links 
 timesofmalta.com

Animals described in 2012
Endemic fauna of Malta
Trombidiformes